Mohanpur is a census town in Barrackpore II CD Block in Barrackpore subdivision of North 24 Parganas district in the state of West Bengal, India.

Geography

Location
Babanpur, Jafarpur, Mohanpur and Telenipara form a cluster of census towns around Barrackpore.

96% of the population of Barrackpore subdivision (partly presented in the map alongside) live in urban areas. In 2011, it had a density of population of 10,967 per km2. The subdivision has 16 municipalities and 24 census towns.

For most of the cities/ towns information regarding density of population is available in the Infobox. Population data is not available for neighbourhoods. It is available for the entire Municipal area and thereafter ward-wise.

All places marked on the map are linked in the full-screen map.

Police station
Khardaha police station under Barrackpore Police Commissionerate has jurisdiction over Khardaha Municipal area and Barrackpore II CD Block.

Demographics
As per the 2011 Census of India, Mohanpur had a total population of 9,096, of which 4,646 (51%) were males and 4,450 (49%) were females. Population below 6 years was 699. The total number of literates in Mohanpur was 7,712 (91.84% of the population over 6 years).

Infrastructure
As per the District Census Handbook 2011, Mohanpur covered an area of 1.4463 km2. Amongst the medical facilities it had were a mobile health clinic and 6 medicine shops. Amongst the educational facilities It had were 3 primary schools, the nearest middle and secondary schools were available 1 km away at Jafarpur and the nearest senior secondary school was available 1.5 km away at Santinagar.

Transport
Mohanpur is located beside the junction (Wireless More) of the Barrackpore-Barasat Road (part of State Highway 2) and the Kalyani Expressway.

Bus

Private Bus
 81 Barasat - Barrackpore Fishery Gate
 81/1 Barasat - Rajchandrapur

WBTC Bus
 C29 Barasat - Barrackpore Court
 E32 Nilganj - Howrah Station
 S11 Nilganj - Esplanade
 S34B Barasat State University - Barrackpore Court
 AC10 Nilganj - Howrah Station

Train
The nearest railway stations are Barasat Junction railway station on the Sealdah-Bangaon line and Barrackpore railway station on the Sealdah-Ranaghat line.

Education
DAV Public School, Barrackpore, was started in 2011. The school presently has around 800 students. It is located beside Kalyani Expressway at Mohanpur.

References

Cities and towns in North 24 Parganas district